The year 2011 in sports saw a number of significant events, some of which are listed below.

Calendar by month

January

February

March
 31 March – 28 October: Baseball, / 2011 Major League Baseball season. 2011 World Series:  St. Louis Cardinals.

April
 17: Marathon,  London Marathon. Winners:  Emmanuel Mutai, Mary Keitany.
 18: Marathon,  Boston Marathon. Winners:  Geoffrey Mutai, Caroline Kilel.

May
 18: Association football,  2011 UEFA Europa League Final. Winner:  Porto.
 21: Rugby union,  2011 Heineken Cup Final. Winner:  Leinster Rugby.
 28: Association football,  2011 UEFA Champions League Final. Winner:  FC Barcelona.
 31 May — 12 June: Basketball, / 2011 NBA Finals. Winner:  Dallas Mavericks.

June
 12: Formula One,  2011 Canadian Grand Prix. Winner:  Jenson Button.
 18 — July 3: Basketball,  EuroBasket Women 2011. Winner: 
 25: MotoGP,  2011 Dutch TT. Winner:  Ben Spies.
 26: Formula One,  2011 European Grand Prix. Winner:  Sebastian Vettel.
 26 — 17 July: Association football,  2011 FIFA Women's World Cup. Winner:

July
 24: Formula One,  2011 German Grand Prix. Winner:  Lewis Hamilton.

August
 29 — September 12: Tennis,  2011 US Open. Winners in singles  Novak Djokovic,  Samantha Stosur. 
 30 — September 11: Basketball,  2011 FIBA Americas Championship. Winner: 
 31 — September 18: Basketball,  EuroBasket 2011. Winner:

September
 7 — 11: Basketball,  2011 FIBA Oceania Championship. Winner: 
 7 — 11: Basketball,  2011 FIBA Oceania Championship for Women. Winner: 
 24 — October 1: Basketball,  2011 FIBA Americas Championship for Women. Winner: 
 25: Formula One,  2011 Singapore Grand Prix. Winner:  Sebastian Vettel
 25: Marathon,  Berlin Marathon. Winners:  Patrick Makau Musyoki,  Florence Kiplagat.

October
 9: Marathon,  Chicago Marathon. Winners:  Moses Mosop,  Liliya Shobukhova.
 16: Formula One,  2011 Korean Grand Prix. Winner:  Sebastian Vettel.

November
 7: Marathon,  New York City Marathon. Winners:  Geoffrey Mutai,  Firehiwot Dado.
 13: Formula One,  2011 Abu Dhabi Grand Prix. Winner:  Lewis Hamilton.

December
 25 – April 2012: Basketball, / 2011–12 NBA season.

Alpine skiing

American football

 Super Bowl XLV – the Green Bay Packers (NFC) won 31–25 over the Pittsburgh Steelers (AFC)
Location: AT&T Stadium
Attendance: 103,219
MVP: Aaron Rodgers, QB (Green Bay)
 January 8 – Peyton Manning plays his final game in an Indianapolis Colts uniform, a 16–17 loss to the New York Jets in the Wild Card round. The next season Manning would sit out the entire 2011 season to undergo neck surgeries and in that offseason, was released by the Colts and subsequently signed with the Denver Broncos in free agency, where he led them to 5 straight playoff appearances, Super Bowl XLVIII, and to their 3rd championship title in Super Bowl 50.
 January 10 – 2011 BCS National Championship Game, University of Phoenix Stadium, Glendale, Arizona: The Auburn Tigers defeated the Oregon Ducks 22–19 claiming the 2010 college football season national championship.
 April 28–30 – 2011 NFL Draft at Radio City Music Hall in New York City. The Carolina Panthers selected quarterback Cam Newton of Auburn as the first overall pick.
 July 8–16 – The 2011 IFAF World Championship was held in Austria. The USA defeated Canada 50–7 in the gold medal match to win their second straight title.
 December 10 – 2011 Heisman Trophy was awarded to Robert Griffin III

Aquatics
2011 FINA Men's Water Polo World League
2011 FINA World Junior Swimming Championships
March 8–13, 2011: 2011 European Diving Championships in Turin, Italy
July 16–31, 2011: 2011 World Aquatics Championships in Shanghai, China
December 8–11, 2011: 2011 European Short Course Swimming Championships in Szczecin, Poland

Association football

 January 7–29 – 2011 AFC Asian Cup in Qatar
Runner up . Third place . MVP  Keisuke Honda
 April 2 and 17 – OFC Champions League final won by Auckland City FC
 April 20 and 27 – CONCACAF Champions League finals:
  C.F. Monterrey defeat  Real Salt Lake 3–2 on aggregate.
 May 28 – UEFA Champions League Final in London:
  FC Barcelona defeat  Manchester United 3–1.
 June 5–25 – 2011 CONCACAF Gold Cup in the United States
 Winner: . Runner-up: . Semifinalists: , . MVP  Javier Hernández.
 June 15 and 22 – Copa Libertadores finals
  Santos defeat  Peñarol 2–1 on aggregate.
 June 17 – July 1 – 2011 CPISRA Football 7-a-side World Championships in the Netherlands
 June 18 – July 10 – 2011 FIFA U-17 World Cup in Mexico
 Mexico won the cup as host being the first team to achieve that, defeating Uruguay 2–0 and achieving their second title in the category.
 June 26 – July 17 – 2011 FIFA Women's World Cup in Germany
Runner up . Third place . Best Player  Homare Sawa
 July 1–24 – 2011 Copa América in Argentina
Runner-up . Third place . Best Player  Luis Suárez.
 July 29 – August 20 – 2011 FIFA U-20 World Cup in Colombia
Runner up . Third place . Best Player  Henrique
 November 5 – AFC Champions League final
  Al-Sadd defeat  Jeonbuk Hyundai Motors 2–2 (4–2 in penalties).
 November 6 and 12 – CAF Champions League finals
  Espérance ST defeat  Wydad Casablanca 1–0 on aggregate.
 December 8–18 – 2011 FIFA Club World Cup in Japan
 Final  FC Barcelona defeat  Santos 4–0.

Athletics

 January 21–30 – 2011 IPC Athletics World Championships in Christchurch, New Zealand
 August 27 – September 4 – 2011 World Championships in Athletics in Daegu, South Korea

Bandy

 January 30,  becomes world champion

Baseball

Basketball

 February 20: 2011 NBA All-Star Game at Staples Center, Los Angeles.
West 148 beat 143 East
 May 8: Euroleague
Panathinaikos beats Maccabi Tel Aviv 78–70 and wins its sixth title in Barcelona. Dimitris Diamantidis was named MVP.
 May 31 – June 12: 2011 NBA Finals
The Western Conference champion Dallas Mavericks defeated the Eastern Conference champion Miami Heat, 4–2, to win their first NBA title. German player Dirk Nowitzki was named Finals MVP.
 August 30 – September 11 – FIBA Americas Championship 2011 in Mar del Plata, Argentina
MVP: 
 September 3–18 – EuroBasket 2011 in Lithuania
MVP: 
 October 2–7: 2011 WNBA Finals
The Western Conference champion Minnesota Lynx defeated the Eastern Conference champion Atlanta Dream, 3–0, to win their first WNBA title. Seimone Augustus was named Finals MVP.

Beach Soccer 
 September 1–11 – The 2011 FIFA Beach Soccer World Cup in Ravenna, Italy.
  puts an end to 's dominance, defeating them in the final by the score of 12–8.  claimed third place.

Beach volleyball 
 June 13–19 – The 2011 Beach Volleyball World Championships in Rome
 Men's Event: 
 Women's Event:

Boxing 

 January 29 – Timothy Bradley defeats Devon Alexander by a tenth round technical decision. The fight was stopped due to a cut Alexander had received from an accidental headbutt in the third round, which was made worse by two more headbutts in the eighth round and a final fourth headbutt in the tenth round. Both fighters came in with undefeated records and the fight was initially praised as one of the few good match-ups between two top-ranked Americans in recent years. With the win, Bradley unified the light welterweight titles by defending his WBO title and winning Alexander's WBC title.
 February 19 – Nonito Donaire defeats Fernando Montiel by technical knockout in the second round to unify the WBO and WBC bantamweight titles. Donaire started the fight strong by controlling most of the first round, landing a left hook that briefly stunned Montiel. In the second round Donaire started landing a few combinations before finishing Montiel with a solid hook that knocked out his opponent.
 March 12 – Sergio Gabriel Martínez knocks out undefeated Sergiy Dzindziruk in the eighth round to win the vacant WBC diamond belt middleweight championship.
 March 12 – Miguel Cotto knocks out Ricardo Mayorga in the twelfth round to retain his WBA world light middleweight title.
 March 19 – Vitali Klitschko knocks out Odlanier Solís in the first round to retain his WBC heavyweight title for the sixth time. The knockout came as a surprise after Solís appeared to have sustained serious knee injury. Initially following the stoppage, Vitali Klitschko was angry at Solís and felt he took a dive. However following the fight Solís was taken to a hospital, where a scan revealed tears to his anterior cruciate ligament and external meniscus, as well as cartilage damage in his right knee.
 April 2 – Giovanni Segura knocks out Iván Calderón in the third round in a repeat of 2010's fight of the year.
 May 7 – Manny Pacquiao easily defeats Shane Mosley, retaining his WBO welterweight title by unanimous decision.
 July 2 – Wladimir Klitschko defeats David Haye by unanimous decision, adding Haye's WBA heavyweight title to the four he already held.

Canadian football
 November 25 – 47th Vanier Cup game at BC Place Stadium in Vancouver – McMaster Marauders defeat Laval Rouge et Or 41–38
 November 27 – 99th Grey Cup game at BC Place Stadium in Vancouver – BC Lions defeat Winnipeg Blue Bombers 34–23

Canoeing
August 17– 21, 2011: 2011 ICF Canoe Sprint World Championships in Szeged, Hungary
September 7–11, 2011: 2011 ICF Canoe Slalom World Championships in Bratislava, Slovakia

Cheerleading 
Cheerleading Worlds
April 28, – May 2, – The Walt Disney World Resort, Orlando, Florida, USA

Cricket
 February 19 – April 2 – 2011 Cricket World Cup in Sri Lanka, India, Bangladesh
The tournament was won by India who defeated Sri Lanka by 6 wickets. India became the first host-nation to win the world cup with final played in the host country itself. Captain Mahendra Singh Dhoni played a captain's knock of unbeaten 91 in the final and was adjudged man of the match.
 Dates TBA – ICC Champions Trophy will take place.
 April 8 – May 28 – 2011 IPL in India. Chennai Super Kings beat Royal Challengers Bangalore by 58 runs in the final to win for the second consecutive year.

Curling

2010–11 curling season
World Championships
Capital One World Women's Curling Championship (Esbjerg, Denmark, Mar. 19–27)
Women's winner:  (Anette Norberg) def.  (Amber Holland)
Ford World Men's Curling Championship (Regina, Saskatchewan, Apr. 2–10)
Men's winner:  (Jeff Stoughton) def.  (Tom Brewster)
World Mixed Doubles Curling Championship (St. Paul, Minnesota, Apr. 15–24)
Winner:  def.

2011–12 curling season
Season of Champions
Canada Cup of Curling (Cranbrook, British Columbia, Nov. 30 – Dec. 4)
Men's winner:  Kevin Martin def.  Glenn Howard
Women's winner:  Jennifer Jones def.  Chelsea Carey

Fencing
October 8–16: 2011 World Fencing Championships in Catania, Italy

Figure skating

 January 24–30 – 2011 European Figure Skating Championships in Bern, Switzerland
 February 15–20 – 2011 Four Continents Figure Skating Championships in Taipei, Taiwan
 February 28 – March 6 – 2011 World Junior Figure Skating Championships in Gangneung, South Korea
 April 24 – May 1 – 2011 World Figure Skating Championships in Moscow, Russia

Floorball
 Women's World Floorball Championships
 Champion: 
 Men's under-19 World Floorball Championships
 Champion: 
 Champions Cup
 Men's champion:  SSV Helsinki
 Women's champion:  IF Djurgårdens IBF

Gymnastics
 2011 European Artistic Gymnastics Championships
 2011 Rhythmic Gymnastics European Championships
2011 World Rhythmic Gymnastics Championships
 2011 World Artistic Gymnastics Championships

Golf

Handball
 January 13–30 – 2011 World Men's Handball Championship in Sweden
MVP = 
 December 3–16 – 2011 World Women's Handball Championship in Brazil

Horse racing
Steeplechases
 Cheltenham Gold Cup – Long Run
 Grand National – Ballabriggs
 Grand Steeple-Chase de Paris – Mid Dancer
 Nakayama Grand Jump – Meiner Neos

Flat races
 Australia:
 Cox Plate – Pinker Pinker
 Melbourne Cup – Dunaden
 Canadian Triple Crown:
 Queen's Plate – Inglorious
 Prince of Wales Stakes – Pender Harbour
 Breeders' Stakes –Pender Harbour
 Luis Contreras becomes the first jockey to win the Canadian Triple Crown aboard two different horses in the same year.
 Dubai, United Arab Emirates: Dubai World Cup – Victoire Pisa
 France: Prix de l'Arc de Triomphe – Danedream
 Hong Kong: Hong Kong International Races
 Hong Kong Vase – Dunaden
 Hong Kong Sprint – Lucky Nine
 Hong Kong Mile – Able One
 Hong Kong Cup – California Memory
 Ireland: Irish Derby – Treasure Beach
 Japan: Japan Cup – Buena Vista
 English Triple Crown:
 2,000 Guineas Stakes – Frankel
 Epsom Derby – Pour Moi
 St. Leger Stakes – Masked Marvel
 United States Triple Crown:
 Kentucky Derby – Animal Kingdom
 Preakness Stakes – Shackleford
 Belmont Stakes – Ruler on Ice
 Breeders' Cup World Thoroughbred Championships at Churchill Downs, Louisville, Kentucky (both days arranged in race card order):
 Day 1:
 Breeders' Cup Juvenile Sprint – Secret Circle
 Breeders' Cup Juvenile Fillies Turf – Stephanie's Kitten
 Breeders' Cup Filly & Mare Sprint – Musical Romance
 Breeders' Cup Juvenile Fillies – My Miss Aurelia
 Breeders' Cup Filly & Mare Turf – Perfect Shirl
 Breeders' Cup Ladies' Classic – Royal Delta
 Day 2:
 Breeders' Cup Marathon – Afleet Again
 Breeders' Cup Juvenile Turf – Wrote
 Breeders' Cup Sprint – Amazombie
 Breeders' Cup Turf Sprint – Regally Ready
 Breeders' Cup Turf – St Nicholas Abbey
 Breeders' Cup Dirt Mile – Caleb's Posse
 Breeders' Cup Juvenile – Hansen
 Breeders' Cup Mile – Court Vision
 Breeders' Cup Classic – Drosselmeyer

Ice hockey

 December 26 (2010)–January 5: 2011 World Junior Ice Hockey Championships in Buffalo, United States.
     
 April 29, – May 15, 2011: 2011 IIHF World Championship in Slovakia, with games being played in Bratislava and Košice.
     
 June 15: The Boston Bruins defeat the Vancouver Canucks 4–0 in game seven to win the 2011 Stanley Cup Final.
 September 7: The entire active roster of the Lokomotiv Yaroslavl team is killed in the 2011 Lokomotiv Yaroslavl plane crash.
 October 6: Start of the 2011–12 NHL regular season.

Ice sledge hockey

 February 12–20 – 2011 IPC Ice Sledge Hockey European Championships in Sollefteå

Kickboxing
The following is a list of major noteworthy kickboxing events during 2011 in chronological order.

|-
|align=center style="border-style: none none solid solid; background: #e3e3e3"|Date
|align=center style="border-style: none none solid solid; background: #e3e3e3"|Event
|align=center style="border-style: none none solid solid; background: #e3e3e3"|Alternate Name/s
|align=center style="border-style: none none solid solid; background: #e3e3e3"|Location
|align=center style="border-style: none none solid solid; background: #e3e3e3"|Attendance
|align=center style="border-style: none none solid solid; background: #e3e3e3"|Notes
|-align=center
|December 31
|Fight For Japan: Genki Desu Ka Omisoka 2011
|Fight for Japan. How are you! New Year! 2011
| Saitama, Japan
|24,606
|
|-align=center

Korfball
 October 27 – 5 November: 2011 Korfball World Championship in Shaoxing, China

Mixed martial arts
The following is a list of major noteworthy MMA events during 2011 in chronological order.

|-
|align=center style="border-style: none none solid solid; background: #e3e3e3"|Date
|align=center style="border-style: none none solid solid; background: #e3e3e3"|Event
|align=center style="border-style: none none solid solid; background: #e3e3e3"|Alternate Name/s
|align=center style="border-style: none none solid solid; background: #e3e3e3"|Location
|align=center style="border-style: none none solid solid; background: #e3e3e3"|Attendance
|align=center style="border-style: none none solid solid; background: #e3e3e3"|PPV Buyrate
|align=center style="border-style: none none solid solid; background: #e3e3e3"|Notes
|-align=center
|January 1
|UFC 125: Resolution
|
| Las Vegas, Nevada, USA
|12,874
|270,000
|
|-align=center
|January 22
|UFC: Fight For The Troops 2
|UFC Fight Night 23
| Killeen, Texas, USA
|3,200
|
|
|-align=center
|January 29
|Strikeforce: Diaz vs. Cyborg
|
| San Jose, California, USA
|9,059
|
|
|-align=center
|February 5
|UFC 126: Silva vs. Belfort
|
| Las Vegas, Nevada, USA
|10,893
|725,000
|
|-align=center
|February 12
|Strikeforce / M-1 Global: Fedor vs. Silva
|Strikeforce: Fedor vs. Silva
| East Rutherford, New Jersey, USA
|11,287
|
|
|-align=center
|February 25
|MFC 28: Supremacy
|
| Edmonton, Alberta, Canada
|
|
|
|-align=center
|February 26
|UFC 127: Penn vs. Fitch
|
| Sydney, Australia
|18,186
|260,000
|
|-align=center
|February 26
|BAMMA 5: Daley vs. Shirai
|
| Manchester, England
|
|
|
|-align=center
|March 3
|UFC Live: Sanchez vs. Kampmann
|
| Louisville, Kentucky, USA
|8,319
|
|
|-align=center
|March 5
|Strikeforce: Feijao vs. Henderson
|Strikeforce: Columbus
| Columbus, Ohio, USA
|7,123
|
|
|-align=center
|March 5
|Bellator XXXV
|
| Lemoore, California, USA
|
|
|
|-align=center
|March 12
|Bellator XXXVI
|
| Shreveport, Louisiana, USA
|
|
|
|-align=center
|March 19
|Bellator XXXVII
|
| Concho, Oklahoma, USA
|
|
|
|-align=center
|March 19
|UFC 128: Shogun vs. Jones
|
| Newark, New Jersey, USA
|12,619
|445,000
|
|-align=center
|March 26
|Bellator XXXVIII
|
| Tunica, Mississippi, USA
|
|
|
|-align=center
|March 26
|UFC Fight Night: Nogueira vs. Davis
|UFC Fight Night 24
UFC Fight Night: Seattle
| Seattle, USA
|13,741
|
|
|-align=center
|April 2
|Bellator XXXIX
|
| Uncasville, Connecticut, USA
|
|
|
|-align=center
|April 8
|MFC 29: Conquer
|
| Windsor, Ontario, Canada
|
|
|
|-align=center
|April 9
|Bellator XL
|
| Newkirk, Oklahoma, USA
|
|
|
|-align=center
|April 9
|Strikeforce: Diaz vs. Daley
|
| San Diego, California, USA
|
|
|
|-align=center
|April 16
|Bellator XLI
|
| Yuma, Arizona, USA
|
|
|
|-align=center
|April 23
|Bellator XLII
|
| Concho, Oklahoma, USA
|
|
|
|-align=center
|April 30
|UFC 129: St-Pierre vs. Shields
|
| Toronto, Ontario, Canada
|55,724
|800,000 (Min.)  900,000 (Max.)
|
|-align=center
|May 6
|Tachi Palace Fights 9
|
| Lemoore, California, USA
|
|
|
|-align=center
|May 7
|Bellator XLIII
|
| Newkirk, Oklahoma, USA
|
|
|
|-align=center
|May 14
|Bellator XLIV
|
| Atlantic City, New Jersey, USA
|
|
|
|-align=center
|May 21
|Bellator XLV
|
| Lake Charles, Louisiana, USA
|
|
|
|-align=center
|May 21
|BAMMA 6: Watson vs. Ninja
|
| London, England
|
|
|
|-align=center
|May 29
|Dream: Fight for Japan!
|
| Saitama, Japan
|6,522
|
|
|-align=center
|June 4
|The Ultimate Fighter 13 Finale
|
| Las Vegas, Nevada, USA
|
|
|
|-align=center
|June 10
|MFC 30: Up Close and Personal
|
| Edmonton, Alberta, Canada
|
|
|
|-align=center
|June 11
|UFC 131: dos Santos vs. Carwin
|
| Vancouver, British Columbia, Canada
|14,685
|325,000 (Min.)335,000 (Max.)
|
|-align=center
|June 18
|Strikeforce: Overeem vs. Werdum
|Strikeforce: Dallas
| Dallas, Texas, USA
|
|
|
|-align=center
|June 25
|Bellator XLVI
|
| Hollywood, Florida, USA
|
|
|
|-align=center
|June 26
|UFC Live: Kongo vs. Barry
|
| Pittsburgh, Pennsylvania, USA
|7,792
|
|
|-align=center
|July 2
|UFC 132: Cruz vs. Faber 2
|
| Las Vegas, Nevada, USA
|13,109
|350,000 (Min.)375,000 (Max.)
|
|-align=center
|July 16
|Dream: Japan GP Final
|
| Tokyo, Japan
|8,142
|
|
|-align=center
|July 23
|Bellator XLVII
|
| Rama, Ontario, Canada
|
|
|
|-align=center
|July 30
|Strikeforce: Fedor vs. Henderson
|
| Hoffman Estates, Illinois, USA
|
|
|
|-align=center
|August 6
|UFC 133: Evans vs. Ortiz 2
|
| Philadelphia, Pennsylvania, USA
|11,583
|
|
|-align=center
|August 14
|UFC Live: Hardy vs. Lytle
|
| Milwaukee, Wisconsin, USA
|6,751
|
|
|-align=center
|August 20
|Bellator XLVIII
|
| Uncasville, Connecticut, USA
|
|
|
|-align=center
|August 27
|UFC 134: Silva vs. Okami
|UFC: Rio
| Rio de Janeiro, Brazil
|
|
|
|-align=center
|September 3
|ONE FC: Champion vs. Champion
|
| Kallang, Singapore
|
|
|
|-align=center
|September 10
|Strikeforce: Heavyweight Grand Prix Semifinals
|
| Cincinnati, Ohio, USA
|
|
|
|-align=center
|September 10
|Bellator XLIX
|
| Atlantic City, New Jersey, USA
|
|
|
|-align=center
|September 10
|BAMMA 7
|
| Birmingham, England
|
|
|
|-align=center
|September 17
|UFC Fight Night: Battle on the Bayou
|UFC Fight Night 25
| New Orleans, Louisiana, USA
|
|
|
|-align=center
|September 17
|Bellator L
|
| Hollywood, Florida, USA
|
|
|
|-align=center
|September 24
|Dream 17
|
| Saitama, Japan
|
|
|
|-align=center
|September 24
|Bellator LI
|
| Canton, Ohio, USA
|
|
|
|-align=center
|September 24
|UFC 135
|
| Denver, Colorado, USA
|
|
|
|-align=center
|October 1
|UFC on Versus 6
|
| Washington, D.C., USA
|
|
|
|-align=center
|October 1
|Bellator LII
|
| Lake Charles, Louisiana, USA
|
|
|
|-align=center
|October 8
|UFC 136: Edgar vs. Maynard III
|
| Houston, Texas, USA
|
|
|
|-align=center
|October 8
|Bellator LIII
|
|
|
|
|
|-align=center
|October 15
|Bellator LIV
|
| Atlantic City, New Jersey, USA
|
|
|
|-align=center
|October 29
|UFC 137: St-Pierre vs. Diaz
|
| Las Vegas, Nevada, USA
|
|
|
|-align=center
|November 5
|UFC 138: Leben vs. Muñoz
|
| Birmingham, England
|
|
|
|-align=center
|November 12
|UFC on Fox: Velasquez vs. Dos Santos
|
| Anaheim, California, USA
|
|
|
|-align=center
|November 19
|Bellator Event
|
| Hollywood, Florida, USA
|
|
|
|-align=center
|December 3
|The Ultimate Fighter 14 Finale
|
| Las Vegas, Nevada USA
|
|
|
|-align=center
|December 10
|UFC 140
|
| Toronto, Ontario, Canada
|
|
|
|-align=center
|December 31
|Fight For Japan: Genki Desu Ka Omisoka 2011
|Fight for Japan. How are you! New Year! 2011
| Saitama, Japan
|24,606
|
|
|-align=center

Motorsport

Multi-sport events
2011 Winter Universiade
2011 Summer Universiade
2011 All-Africa Games
2011 Pan American Games
2011 Asian Winter Games
2011 South Asian Winter Games
2011 Pacific Games
2011 South East Asian Games
2011 Military World Games
2011 Commonwealth Youth Games
2011 Special Olympics World Summer Games
2011 Island Games
2011 ALBA Games
2011 European Youth Winter Olympic Festival
2011 European Youth Summer Olympic Festival

Netball
 July 3–10: 2011 Netball World Championships in Singapore
2011 April 15 – 20th	National Netball Championships 17/U & 19/U

June 9	Diamonds v Silver Ferns, Palmerston North

12th	Diamonds v Silver Ferns, Auckland

July 3 – 10th	World Netball Championships 2011

12th – 17th	National Netball Championships 21/U

Jul 30 – 18 Sep	Australian Netball League 2011

September 8 – 11th	NetFest 2011 – Netball on the Gold Coast

October 9	Diamonds v England, Newcastle

12th	Diamonds v England, Canberra

16th	Diamonds v England, Sydney

23rd	Diamonds v Silver Ferns, Perth

26th	Diamonds v Silver Ferns, Adelaide

30th	Diamonds v Silver Ferns, Melbourne

Nordic skiing

Rink Hockey
2011 Rink Hockey Asian Championship
2011 Ladies Rink Hockey European Championship
2011 Rink Hockey World Championship San Juan, Argentina
2011 Rink Hockey World Championship U-20, in Barcelos, Portugal
won by  Spain
2011 Ladies Rink Hockey European Championship

Road bicycle racing 
May 7–29: 2011 Giro d'Italia
Alberto Contador sealed overall victory in the Giro d'Italia for the second time in his career. The win was later awarded to second-place finisher Michele Scarponi after Contador was given a retroactive ban following his positive test for clenbuterol at the 2010 Tour de France.
July 2–24: 2011 Tour de France
Australian Cadel Evans won the race, having gained the lead in a time-trial on the penultimate day. He became the first Australian to win the race, and at 34, the oldest post-war winner.
August 20 – September 11: 2011 Vuelta a España
Spanish Juan José Cobo claimed his first major title. British Chris Froome and Bradley Wiggins on the podium.
September 19–25: 2011 UCI Road World Championships in Copenhagen, Denmark
 Mark Cavendish became the first British male since Tom Simpson to win the road race title

Rowing
 August 28 to September 4 – 2011 World Rowing Championships will be held at Lake Bled, Bled, Slovenia.

Rugby league

2011's Golden Boot for world's best player was awarded to Australian half back Johnathan Thurston.
 February 13; NRL All Stars Game
 February 23; World Club Challenge
 May; City vs Country Origin
 May; Australia vs New Zealand ANZAC Test
 May 25 – 6 July: State of Origin
  Queensland defeat  New South Wales 2–1 for their sixth consecutive series win.
 June 10: International Origin Match at Headingley Rugby Stadium, Leeds
 In the first of what is planned to be an annual affair, the Exiles, a team consisting of non-English Super League players, defeated  16–12.
 August; Challenge Cup final
 March 11 to October 2; National Rugby League season
 Champions:  Manly-Warringah Sea Eagles
 Minor premiers:  Melbourne Storm
 February 12 to October 2; 2011 Super League season
 Champions:  Leeds Rhinos
 League Leaders:  Warrington Wolves
 November; Rugby League Four Nations

Rugby union

February 4 – 19 March: Six Nations Championship
Winner: , 26th title.
May 20: Amlin Challenge Cup Final at Cardiff City Stadium, Cardiff
 Harlequins claimed the title with a 19–18 win over  Stade Français, becoming the first team to win the Challenge Cup three times.
May 21: Heineken Cup Final at Millennium Stadium, Cardiff
 Leinster won its second European title with a 33–22 win over  Northampton Saints.
IRB Sevens World Series –  clinched the series title at the London Sevens on May 22, with the Edinburgh Sevens remaining to be played.
May 24 – 5 June: 2011 IRB Junior World Rugby Trophy in Georgia
This was the first title for Samoa.
June 10–26: 2011 IRB Junior World Championship in Italy
This was the fourth title for New Zealand.
 July 9: Super Rugby Final at Suncorp Stadium, Brisbane
The  Reds claimed their first title in the competition's professional era with an 18–13 win over the  Crusaders.
 July 23 – 27 August: Tri Nations Series
  won its third title.
 This was also the final edition of the Tri Nations under that name.
 September 9 – 23 October: 2011 Rugby World Cup in New Zealand
 The tournament was won by New Zealand's All Blacks defeating France in the final by a score of 8–7.

Domestic competitions
  English Premiership – Final, May 28 at Twickenham: Leicester Tigers vs. Saracens
Saracens defeated Leicester Tigers 22–18 for their first-ever Premiership title.
RFU Championship – Worcester Warriors. As the only side among the semifinalists that met the requirements for promotion, they replaced Leeds Carnegie in the 2011–12 Premiership.
  Top 14 – Final, June 4 at Stade de France: Toulouse vs. Montpellier
 Toulouse won 15–10 and lifted the Bouclier de Brennus for the 18th time.
 Rugby Pro D2 – Lyon won the championship and automatic promotion to the Top 14. Bordeaux Bègles won the promotion playoffs. The two clubs will replace La Rochelle and Bourgoin.
     Celtic League – Grand Final, May 28 in Limerick:
In an all-Irish affair, Munster won their third title against Leinster 19–9.
   LV Cup (Anglo-Welsh Cup) – Gloucester
  ITM Cup:
 Premiership – Final, September 3 in Hamilton: Waikato vs. Canterbury
 Canterbury won 12–3 for their fourth consecutive title in the Air New Zealand/ITM Cup and ninth in the history of New Zealand provincial rugby.
 Championship: Final, September 4 in Palmerston North: Manawatu vs. Hawke's Bay
 Hawke's Bay won 35–30 and will replace Southland in the 2012 ITM Cup Premiership.
  Currie Cup: Final, October 29 in Johannesburg: Golden Lions vs. 
 The Lions won 42–16 in the most one-sided Currie Cup final since 1980.

Other major events
 February 26: During the England–France match in the Six Nations, England's Jonny Wilkinson retakes the all-time lead for career Test points from New Zealand's Dan Carter.
 February 27: During the Scotland–Ireland match in the Six Nations, Ireland's Ronan O'Gara retakes the all-time lead for career points in the Championship from Wilkinson.
 March 19: During the Ireland–England Six Nations match, two Irish players reach major career milestones in the Championship:
 Brian O'Driscoll takes over the all-time lead for career tries in the Championship with his 25th try, breaking the record of Scotland's Ian Smith that had lasted since 1933.
 Ronan O'Gara makes his 56th appearance in the Championship, drawing level with countryman Mike Gibson for the Championship record.
 July 30: During New Zealand's Tri Nations opener at home to South Africa, Carter reclaims the all-time lead for career Test points from Wilkinson.

Ski mountaineering

Squash

Sumo

Swimming

Tennis

2011 Australian Open (January 17–30)
 Men's final: Novak Djokovic defeats Andy Murray 6–4, 6–2, 6–3
 Women's final: Kim Clijsters defeats Li Na 3–6, 6–3, 6–3
2011 French Open (May 17 – June 5)
 Men's final: Rafael Nadal defeats Roger Federer 7–5, 7–6, 5–7, 6–1
 Women's final: Li Na defeats Francesca Schiavone 6–4, 7–6(7–0)
2011 Wimbledon Championships (June 20 – July 3)
 Men's final: Novak Djokovic defeats Rafael Nadal 6–4, 6–1, 1–6, 6–3
 Women's final: Petra Kvitová defeats Maria Sharapova 6–3, 6–4
2011 US Open (August 29 – September 12)
 Men's final: Novak Djokovic defeats Rafael Nadal 6–2, 6–4, 6–7, 6–1
 Women's final: Samantha Stosur defeats Serena Williams 6–2, 6–3
2011 WTA Tour Championships in Istanbul, Turkey. (October 24–30)
  Petra Kvitová defeats  Victoria Azarenka 7–5 4–6 6–3. 1st title
2011 Fed Cup (February – November)
  won the Fed Cup for the sixth time beating  in Moscow 3–2.
2011 ATP World Tour Finals in London, United Kingdom. (November 20–27)
  Roger Federer defeats  Jo-Wilfried Tsonga 6–3, 6–7, 6–3. Sixth title.
2011 Davis Cup (March – December)
  defeats  in Seville. 5th title.

Volleyball
 Women's CEV Champions League 2010–11 November 23, 2010 – March 20, 2011. Final Four in Istanbul, Turkey
 Champions  VakıfBank Güneş TTelekom,  Rabita Baku,   Fenerbahçe Acıbadem . MVP: 
 Men's CEV Champions League 2010–11 November 17, 2010 – March 27, 2011. Final Four in Bolzano, Italy.
 Champions   Trentino BetClic,   Zenit Kazan,   Dynamo Moscow. MVP: 
 2011 Montreux Volley Masters June 7–12 in Montreux, Switzerland
MVP: 
2011 FIVB World League, May 27 – July 10, 2011, with the Final Eight in Gdańsk / Sopot, Poland
MVP: 
2011 FIVB Women's Junior World Championship July 22–31 in Lima and Trujillo, Peru
MVP: 
2011 FIVB Men's Junior World Championship August 1–10 in Rio de Janeiro and Niteròi, Brazil
MVP: 
2011 FIVB World Grand Prix August 5–28, with the Final Eight in Macau, China
MVP: 
2011 Men's European Volleyball Championship September 10–18 in Austria and Czech Republic
MVP: 
2011 Women's European Volleyball Championship September 22 – October 2 in Italy and Serbia
MVP: 
2011 FIVB Women's World Cup November 4–18 in Japan
MVP: 
2011 FIVB Men's World Cup November 20 – December 4 in Japan
MVP:

See also
 International sports calendar 2011

References

External links
 The-Sports.org